The Iron Tonic: Or, A Winter Afternoon in Lonely Valley is a Surrealist country-house mystery—that is, a series of clues that do not add up to a solution—written and illustrated by Edward Gorey. It was published in 1969 by Albondoncani Press in a limited edition of 226 copies. It was republished for the trade market by Harcourt, Inc. in the form of a small, hardbound book that is illustrated on both front and back covers.

Dedicated to the memory of the author's maternal great-grandmother, Helen St. John Garvey (1834–1907), and written and illustrated by Gorey in his characteristic fine-lined, 19th-century-engraving style, the work comprises 14 panels of illustration and rhyming text in iambic pentameter. It tells the story of an eerie, melancholy manor whose inhabitants are either old or unwell.

Literary reception 

Wim Tigges described the book as "a compilation of hardly related couplets," in which nonsense objects "are seen to be falling unaccountably out of the sky." Tigges notes it uses a device commonly used in Gorey's writing, "the unexplained recurrence of an irrelevant object".

References 

1969 books
Books by Edward Gorey